Donald Alex Blenkarn (June 17, 1930 – January 30, 2012) was a Progressive Conservative Party of Canada Member of Parliament.

Blenkarn was born in Toronto. A lawyer and businessman by profession, he was elected in 1972 to represent the riding of Peel South. He held on the riding until the 1974 election when he was defeated by Liberal Anthony Abbott. He was re-elected to the House of Commons as the Member of Parliament for Mississauga South in 1979 and served as the Chairman of the House of Commons Finance Committee during the Mulroney years. He was defeated by Liberal Paul Szabo in the 1993 election.

Blenkarn owned a tree farm later in life in Hockley Valley.

References

 

1930 births
2012 deaths
Members of the House of Commons of Canada from Ontario
Politicians from Toronto
Progressive Conservative Party of Canada MPs